Andrés de Tapia (1498? - October 1561) was a Spanish soldier and chronicler. He participated in the Spanish conquest of the Aztec Empire.

References

Spanish conquistadors
1490s births
1561 deaths